DAV may refer to:

 DAV, a type of pulsating white dwarf
Dav (journal) (1924-1937), a defunct leftist journal
 IATA code "DAV" for Enrique Malek International Airport, Chiriquí, Panama
D.A.V. College Managing Committee, governing body of the Dayanand Anglo-Vedic College Trust and Management Society, an Indian educational society
DAV University, the flagship school of the DAV system, in Jalandhar, Punjab, India
Democratic Association of Victoria, an Australian socialist organisation
 (German Actuarial Society), German professional society
 (German Alpine Club), a sports union in Germany
Disabled American Veterans, an American veterans organization
WebDAV (Web Distributed Authoring and Versioning), an extension of HTTP
Diplomatic Academy of Vietnam

People with the name
Dav Pilkey (born 1966), American author and illustrator of children's literature
Dav Whatmore (born 1954), Sri Lankan-born Australian cricketer and coach